Lutz Landwehr von Pragenau (born 1963) is a German composer of classical music.

He was born in Regensburg and studied composition with Wilhelm Killmayer at the Hochschule für Musik und Theater München, continued in a masterclass with Hans-Jürgen von Bose from 1992 to 1994. He has been teaching music pedagogy at the Regensburg University.

Selected works 
 Der Jäger von Fall, opera after a libretto by Wilhelm Killmayer (1991)

Orchestra
 Times Square Music for large orchestra Orchester (1990)
 Running Riot for brass band and orchestra (1993)
 ...mild und leise..., Tristan's death for large orchestra (2010)

Chamber music
 Klavierquintett für Paul Celan, piano quintet (1990)
 Berührungen for piano 4 hands and conga (1999)
 The Day After Rendevouz for violin, tuba and tape (1992)
 Silence invades the breathing wood for soprano, violin, viola, cello and small percussion (2011)
 Takte und Gewichte, string quartet (2001)
 In der Schwebe for cello and piano (2009)
 Yolimba läßt grüßen, variations on a theme by Wilhelm Killmayer for violin and piano (2010)
 Duo concertant for two pianos (1997)

Vocal
 Zwei Lieder für Bariton und Klavier, songs for baritone and piano on poems by Otto Julius Bierbaum (1979): op.1/1 (Freundliche Vision), op.1/2 (Traum durch die Dämmerung) 
 Missa in excelsis, mass for women choir (2002)
 tierisch gebildet, cantata for speaker, choir and instruments after poems by Christian Morgenstern (2004)
 Zwei Lieder für tiefe Stimme (two songs for a low voice) on Italian texts by Aldo Palazzeschi (2008): 1) Il Passo delle Nazarene 2) Il segno

External links 
 Lutz Landwehr von Pragenau Bayerisches Musiker Lexikon Online of the Munich University 
 
 Alexander Strauch: Was ist Solidarität - Für Lutz Landwehr v. Pragenau Neue Musikzeitung, 14 October 2012 

German composers
1963 births
Living people